The Kayaderosseras Creek, usually shortened to Kaydeross, is the largest river that lies completely within Saratoga County, New York State. It originates in the Kayaderosseras Range in the northern part of the county, passes through the towns of Corinth, Greenfield, and Milton, and serves as the boundary between the City of Saratoga Springs and the Town of Malta before emptying into Saratoga Lake.

History
The Mohawk tribe of the Iroquois Five Nations used the associated valley as a summer hunting and fishing destination. They named the creek Kayaderosseras (which translates into "Valley of the Crooked Stream") due to its tortuous course and dramatic drop in elevation.  An 1887 source says that the name was derived from French terms, a Mohawk corruption of either pays arrosé, a watered country, or pays des ruisseaux, a
country of streams, adapted by the Mohawk when they pushed out the previous inhabitants, the Mahican, in the 17th century.

The creek is best known for providing water power to a host of paper mills and a hard edge-tool factory in the 19th century. "Paper Bag King" George West established his paper bag empire on the banks of the Kayaderosseras Creek in Rock City Falls in 1862. Of the dozen paper mills situated along the creek in the late 19th century, only the Cottrell Paper Company is still in operation as of 2016.

From 1898 to 1929, the  Kaydeross Railroad, or Ballston Terminal Railroad, a trolley railroad line, closely followed the banks of the creek to serve the paper mills and Isaiah Blood's tool factory. Although this line also carried passengers, it mainly existed to carry freight.

Over-logging caused the flow of the creek to decrease dramatically in the late 19th and early 20th centuries. Today the creek possesses several popular fishing spots, especially in Rock City Falls, Milton Center, and Craneville. The principal fish is the brown trout, which is stocked.

Gallery

References 

The Ballston Terminal Railroad And Its Successors, 2007

External links 
 Friends of the Kayaderosseras
 Ballston Spa History - Industries and Railroads
 Town of Milton, N.Y.
 Taff, Conor. "Geologic History of the Kayaderosseras Watershed"
 Kayaderosseras Creek Preserve

Rivers of New York (state)
Rivers of Saratoga County, New York